Qarayevkənd (also, Karayevka and Karayevkend) is a village and municipality in the Saatly Rayon of Azerbaijan.  It has a population of 2,561.

References 

Populated places in Saatly District